The Congressional Motorcycle Safety Caucus is a bipartisan caucus of the United States House of Representatives.

Founding and Members
The caucus founders and co-chairs are Representatives Michael Burgess (R-TX) and Tim Walberg (R-MI). The caucus was founded on June 26, 2009, and is officially registered with the Committee on House Administration, the House committee responsible for regulating caucuses. As of 2022, there were 13 members - four Democrats and eight Republicans: 
Mike Burgess (R-TX) Co-chair
Tim Walberg (R-MI) Co-chair
Don Bacon (R-NE)
Tim Walz (D-MN)
G.K. Butterfield (D-NC) Retiring at end of 117th Congress.
Doug Lamborn (R-CO)
Rick Crawford (R-AR)
Paul Gosar (R-AZ)
Andy Harris (R-MD)
Sean Patrick Maloney (D-NY)
Donald Norcross (D-NJ)
Scott Perry (R-PA)
Claudia Tenney (R-NY)

Activities
In an open letter to motorcyclists in 2010, the Congressional Motorcycle Safety Caucus urged riders to participate in the annual Ride to Work Day on June 21, 2010, and encouraged riders and other road users to focus on safety.

See also
Motorcycle Safety Foundation
Motorcycle safety
Motorcycle training
Motorcycling
Congressional Bike Caucus

References

External links

Caucuses of the United States Congress
Motorcycle safety